Meeraner Sportverein is a German football club from Meerane, Saxony. It currently plays in the Landesklasse, the eighth tier in the German football league system.

It was founded in 1907 as SpVgg Meerane 07 and refounded as SG Meerane after World War II, also being called SG Einheit Meerane and BSG Fortschritt Meerane, the last one after being made a company team of a textiles factory. It was a founder member of East Germany's DDR-Oberliga in 1949, playing six seasons until relegation in 1955, never to return. It ranked 23rd of 44 teams in the All-time DDR-Oberliga table. Upon German reunification, it reverted to its original name.

Richard Hofmann, German international striker of the 1920s and 1930s, was born in Meerane and played for the team, later becoming namesake of their stadium.

References

1907 establishments in Germany
Association football clubs established in 1907
Football clubs in East Germany
Football clubs in Germany
Football clubs in Saxony
Works association football clubs in Germany